Calosoma wilcoxi is a species of ground beetle in the subfamily Carabinae. It was described by John Lawrence LeConte in 1848.

References

wilcoxi
Beetles described in 1848